Operation Sunbaker was a military operation by the  Services Reconnaissance Department of Australian Army in Timor in May 1945. The aim was to insert a team of operatives behind enemy lines. A B-24 Liberator A72-159 of 200 Flight RAAF taking the team was shot down on 17 May near Dili with the loss of all on board.

The dead were:
AIRCRAFT CREW
F/O T.T. Biltoft
F/Lt. H.R. Campbell
F/O H.J. Clark
F/O H.A.J. Jones
F/Lt. J.W. Rice
F/O L.J. Brown
F/O A. McL. Clark, DFM (captain)
F/Sgt. C.A.R. Gamble
F/O G.M. Manning, DFM
Sgt. H. Riley 	

"Z" SPECIAL OPERATION MEMBERS
Lt. A.F. Wilkins
Sgt. K.H. Bell
Cpl A.L. Lilya
Cpl J.A. Nicol
Sgt. K.M. Marshall

References

Notes

Sunbaker
1945 in Portuguese Timor
Sunbaker
South West Pacific theatre of World War II
May 1945 events
Sunbaker